South of Suez is a 1940 American drama film directed by Lewis Seiler and starring George Brent, Brenda Marshall and George Tobias. An alleged murder in an African diamond mine haunts a man many years later after he has returned to Britain. The film was made as a programmer by Warner Brothers. It was part of a cycle of British-themed films made by Hollywood studios during the era.

Plot
In 1930s East Africa, mining engineer John Gamble (George Brent) is falsely accused of killing his partner, Roger Smythe (Miles Mander). Actually, the real culprit is a rival prospector, Eli Snedeker (George Tobias), a man obsessed with diamonds. Snedeker shot Smythe and stole his $50,000 gem, dubbed the Star of Africa. Later, he convinced other miners of Gamble's guilt. Having been framed, Gamble has no choice but to flee Africa. He stows away on a ship bound for England. Upon arriving, Gamble changes his name to "John Bradley" and dabbles in investment banking. Years later, after achieving wealth, he meets and falls in love with a rich heiress, Kit Sheffield (Brenda Marshall), who turns out to be the daughter of Smythe, Gamble's dead partner. She tells Gamble/Bradley that her one overriding ambition in life is to see John Gamble dead.

One rainy evening, Fate offers Gamble the opportunity to rid himself of his old identity. He secretly plants his credentials on the body of a dead, unknown itinerant beneath a London bridge. The subsequent discovery of the corpse convinces authorities that John Gamble is indeed dead. This clears the way for he and Kit to marry. But a fateful intervention results in a courtroom trial involving Snedeker, who has moved to London as a semi-retired diamond cutter. Gamble/Bradley reluctantly testifies and confirms Snedeker's accusation that he is the real John Gamble, the suspected murderer of Kit's father. However, Snedeker's wife (Lee Patrick) volunteers further testimony and reveals to the court that Snedeker was the real murderer. In a rage, Snedeker pulls out a pistol and shoots his wife. But her input is enough to convince the court that Gamble is innocent of Smythe's murder. He and Kit can now, finally, marry.

Main cast

Production
The lead role was meant to be played by George Raft but he turned it down, so George Brent played it.

References

Bibliography
 Glancy, H. Mark. When Hollywood Loved Britain: The Hollywood 'British' Film 1939-1945. Manchester University Press, 1999.

External links

1940 films
1940 drama films
American drama films
Films directed by Lewis Seiler
Films scored by Friedrich Hollaender
Films set in London
Films set in Africa
Warner Bros. films
American black-and-white films
1940s English-language films
1940s American films